Maksat Atabayev (born November 28, 1994) is the FIDE Arbiter/Trainer from Turkmenistan. He was the FIDE Master (FM) in 2010, International Master (IM) 2012 and Grandmaster (GM) in 2015.

Notable Tournaments

References 

1994 births
Living people
Turkmenistan chess players
Chess grandmasters
Chess arbiters
People from Gypjak